Ludmila Polesná (31 August 1934 in Písek - 9 December 1988 in Prague) was a Czechoslovak slalom canoeist who competed from the early 1960s to the mid-1970s. She won eleven medals at the ICF Canoe Slalom World Championships with four golds (Folding K-1: 1961, 1963; K-1: 1967, 1969), five silvers (K-1: 1971, K-1 team: 1965, 1967, 1969, Folding K-1 team: 1963) and two bronzes (K-1 team: 1971, 1975).

Polesná also finished 16th in the K-1 event at the 1972 Summer Olympics in Munich.

References

1934 births
1988 deaths
Canoeists at the 1972 Summer Olympics
Czech female canoeists
Czechoslovak female canoeists
Olympic canoeists of Czechoslovakia
Medalists at the ICF Canoe Slalom World Championships
Sportspeople from Písek